The Satires ( or Sermones) is a collection of satirical poems written by the Roman poet Horace. Composed in dactylic hexameters, the Satires explore the secrets of human happiness and literary perfection. Published probably in 35 BC and at the latest, by 33 BC, the first book of Satires represents Horace's first published work. It established him as one of the great poetic talents of the Augustan Age. The second book was published in 30 BC as a sequel.

In his Sermones (Latin for "conversations") or Satires (Latin for "miscellaneous poems"), Horace combines Epicurean, that is, originally Greek, philosophy with Roman good sense to convince his readers of the futility and silliness of their ambitions and desires. As an alternative, he proposes a life that is based on the Greek philosophical ideals of autarkeia (Greek for "inner self-sufficiency") and metriotes (Greek for "moderation" or sticking to the Just Mean). In S. 1.6.110–131, Horace illustrates what he means by describing a typical day in his own simple, but contented life.

The second book also addresses the fundamental question of Greek Hellenistic philosophy, the search for a happy and contented life. In contrast to Satires I, however, many of this book's poems are dialogues in which the poet allows a series of pseudo-philosophers, such as the bankrupt art-dealer turned Stoic philosopher Damasippus, the peasant Ofellus, the mythical seer Teiresias, and the poet's own slave, Dama, to espouse their philosophy of life, in satiric contrast to that of the narrator.

Although the Satires are considered to be inferior to the Odes, they have been received positively in recent decades.

Poetic models
Horace's direct predecessor as writer of satires was Lucilius. Horace inherits from Lucilius the hexameter, the conversational and sometimes even "prosaic" tone of his poetry, and the tradition of personal attack. In contrast to Lucilius, although, the victims of Horace's mockery are not members of the nobility, but overly ambitious freedmen, anonymous misers, courtesans, street philosophers, hired buffoons, and bad poets. In accordance with the Epicurean principle Lathe biosas (Greek for "Live unnoticed"), Horace consciously does not get involved in the complicated politics of his times, but advocates instead a life that focuses on individual happiness and virtue.

Probably equally important is the influence of Greek diatribe in the tradition of the philosopher Bion of Borysthenes (c. 335–245 BC). Horace's Satires share with this genre some of their themes, typical imagery, and similes, and the fiction of an anonymous interlocutor whose objections the speaker easily refutes.

In addition, Horace alludes to another inspiration, the poet Lucretius whose didactic epic De rerum natura ("On the Nature of Things"), also written in hexameters, popularized Epicurean physics in Rome. For example, Horace's comparison of his satires with cookies that a teacher uses to encourage his students to learn their letters, reminds of Lucretius' more traditional comparison of his poetry with the sugar that sweetens the bitter medicine of philosophy. Moreover, Lucretian stock phrases such as nunc ad rem redeo ("now I return to the matter at hand") give Horace's philosophical "conversations" (Sermones) a subtly Lucretian flavor.

Content
Satire 1.1, Qui fit, Maecenas ("How come, Maecenas"), targets avarice and greed.

Most people, the satirist argues, complain about their lot yet do not really want to change it. Our insatiable greed for material wealth is just as silly. The true basic human needs, food and water, are easily satisfied. A person who recognizes the natural limit (modus) set for our desires, the Just Mean between the extremes, will in the end, leave the Banquet of Life like a satisfied guest, full, and content.

Satire 1.2, Ambubaiarum collegia ("The trade unions of singing Syrian courtesans"), deals with adultery and other unreasonable behaviour in sexual matters.

The satirist claims that there is also a natural mean with regard to sex. Our basic sexual urges are easily satisfied (any partner will do), so it seems silly to run after married noblewomen instead.

Satire 1.3, Omnibus hoc vitium est ("Everyone has this flaw"), demands fairness when we criticize other people’s flaws. In the case of friends, we should be especially lenient.

Satire 1.4, Eupolis atque Cratinus ("Eupolis and Cratinus"), in a programmatic declaration of Horace's poetic views, he applies these same critical principles to poetry and shows that his own satires follow them.

Satire 1.5, Egressum magna ... Roma ("Having left great Rome"), describes a journey from Rome to Brundisium. It is thus, also known as the Iter Brundisium or Iter ad Brundisium.

Alluding to a famous satire in which Horace’s poetic model, Lucilius, described a trip to his knightly estates near Tarentum, this satire offers a comic self-portrait of Horace as an insignificant member in the retinue of his powerful friend Maecenas when the latter negotiated one last truce between Antony and Octavian, the Peace of Brundisium (36 BC). A highpoint of the satire is the central verbal contest that again, just as in S. 1.4, distinguishes scurrility from satire.  Here, Horace pitches a ‘’scurra’’ (buffoon) from the capital, the freedman Sarmentus, against his ultimately victorious local challenger, Messius Cicirrus (“the Fighting Cock”).

Satire 1.6, Non quia, Maecenas ("Not because, Maecenas"), rejects false ambition.

With the same modesty, with which he just depicted himself in Satire 1.5, Horace explains why he is not interested in a career in politics even though he once, during the Civil War, served as the tribune of a Roman legion (48). People would jeer at him because of his freedman father, and his father taught him to be content with his status in life (85–87) even though he made sure that his son could enjoy the same education as an aristocrat (76–80).

Satire 1.7, Proscripti Regis Rupili pus atque venenum ("The pus and poison of the proscribed Rupilius Rex"), deals with a trial that Persius, a Greek merchant of dubious birth (hybrida, 2), won against the Roman Rupilius Rex.

Following the account of Horace's youth in S. 1.6, this satire tells a story from his service under Brutus during the Civil War. Just as in S. 1.5, it features a verbal contest in which two different kinds of invective are fighting against each other. Initially, Greek verbosity seems to succumb to Italian acidity, but in the end, the Greek wins with a clever turn of phrase, calling on the presiding judge, Brutus the Liberator, to do his duty and dispose of the "king" (Latin: 'rex') Rupilius Rex (33–35).

Satire 1.8, Olim truncus eram ("Once I was a tree trunk"), describes a funny victory over witchcraft and superstition.

Another hybrida like Persius in S. 1.7, Priapus, half garden god, half still a barely shaped piece of wood, narrates the visit of two terrible witches to Maecenas' garden that he is supposed to protect against trespassers and thieves. Maecenas' garden on the Esquiline Hill used to be a cemetery for executed criminals and the poor, and so it attracts witches that dig for magic bones and harmful herbs. The god is powerless until the summer heat makes the figwood that he is made of explode, and this divine "fart" chases the terrified witches away.

Satire 1.9, Ibam forte Via Sacra ("I happened to be walking on the Sacred Way"), the famous encounter between Horace and the Boor, relates another funny story of a last-minute delivery from an overpowering enemy.

Horace is accosted by an ambitious flatterer and would-be poet who hopes that Horace will help him to worm his way into the circle of Maecenas' friends. Horace tries in vain to get rid of the Boor. He assures him that this is not how Maecenas and his friends operate. Yet he only manages to get rid of him, when finally a creditor of the Boor appears and drags him off to court, with Horace offering to serve as a witness (74–78).

Satire 1.10, Nempe incomposito ("I did indeed say that Lucilius' verses hobble along"), functions as an epilogue to the book. Here Horace clarifies his criticism of his predecessor Lucilius, jokingly explains his choice of the genre ("nothing else was available") in a way that groups him and his Satires among the foremost poets of Rome, and lists Maecenas and his circle as his desired audience.

Literary success
Both in antiquity and in the Middle Ages, Horace was much better known for his Satires and the thematically-related Epistles than for his lyric poetry. In the century after his death, he finds immediate successors in Persius and Juvenal, and even Dante still refers to him simply as "Orazio satiro" (Inferno 4.89). Conte (1994: 318) writes, "Over 1,000 medieval quotations from his Satires and Epistles have been traced, only about 250 from his Carmina."

See also
Prosody (Latin)
Short, sharp shock

Notes

Selected bibliography

Critical editions of the Latin text
 Borzsák, Stephan. Q. Horati Flacci Opera. Leipzig: Teubner, 1984.
 Shackleton Bailey, D. R. Q. Horati Flacci Opera. Stuttgart: Teubner, 1995. . Makes more use of conjectural emendation than Borzsák.

On-line editions of Horace's Satires, Latin
Sermones (Horatius), Wikisource (Latin).
All satires book I and II, in Latin. (With notes, also in Latin) Orelli rev. Baiter 5th ed. 1868. Retrieved 20 September 2010.
Satirae, Peerlkamp 1863.
Carminum, Satirarum I et II,  Epodon, Epistolarum, Ars poetica, etc., Long and MacLeane 1853.
Satirarum Liber I & II , Desprez 1828 in usum Delphini.
Sermonum Liber I , Zeune 1825 in usum Delphini.
Satires 1.5, 1.6, and 1.9 (in Latin) with vocabulary lists (in English). 'The Dickinson College Wiki', Retrieved 20 September 2010.
 Bibliotheca Augustana 
 The Latin Library (Latin) 
 IntraText (Latin) 
 Perseus Project (Latin)

Horace's Satires, in English translation 
 Satires, Epistles, and Art of Poetry (Engl.). Translated into English verse by John Conington, m.a. corpus professor of Latin at the University of Oxford. Project Gutenberg. Retrieved 20 September 2010. N.B. Satire I-2 is excluded.
First book of Satires, with notes (all in English). R. M. Millington 1869. Retrieved 20 September  2010.
Epodes, Satires and Epistles, in English. Also an introduction (of 5 pages). Rev. Francis Howes 1845. Retrieved 20 September  2010.
 Alexander, Sidney. The complete Odes and Satires of Horace. Princeton, N.J.: Princeton University Press, 1999. .
 Juster, A.M. The Satires of Horace. Philadelphia, PA: University of Pennsylvania Press, 2008. .
 Rudd, Niall. Horace, Satires and Epistles; Persius, Satires. London : Penguin, 2005.  (verse translation with introduction and notes).

Commentary
 Brown, P. Michael. Horace, Satires I. Warminster, England: Aris & Phillips, 1993.  (introduction, text, translation and commentary)
Gowers, Emily. Satires. Book 1. Cambridge University Press, 2012.  (introduction, text and commentary)
 Law, Andy. A Translation and Interpretation of Horace’s Sermones, Book I. Cambridge Scholars Publishing, 2021.  (introduction, text, translation and interpretation)
 Muecke, Frances. Horace, Satires II. Warminster, England: Aris & Phillips, 1993, repr. with corr. 1997.  (hb).  (pb) (introduction, text, translation and extensive scholarly commentary)

Short surveys
 Conte, Gian Biagio. Latin Literature. A History. Translated by Joseph Solodow. Baltimore: Johns Hopkins University Press, 1994. .
 Braund, Susan H. Roman Verse Satire. Oxford: Oxford University Press, 1992. .
 Freudenburg, Kirk. Satires of Rome: Threatening Poses from Lucilius to Juvenal. Cambridge: Cambridge University Press, 2001. .
 Hooley, Daniel M. Roman Satire. Malden, MA: Blackwell Pub., 2007. .

More specialized literature
 Anderson, William S. "Ironic Preambles and Satiric Self-Definition in Horace Satire 2.1." Pacific Coast Philology 19 (1984) 36–42.
 Bernstein, Michael André. "O Totiens Servus: Saturnalia and Servitude in Augustan Rome." Critical Inquiry 13 (1986-1987) 450–74.
 Braund, Susan H. "City and Country in Roman Satire." In: Braund, S. H., ed. Satire and Society in Ancient Rome. Exeter: University of Exeter Press, 1989, 23–47.
 Clauss, James J. "Allusion and structure in Horace Satire 2.1. The Callimachean response." Transactions of the American Philological Association 115 (1985) 197–206.
 Classen, Carl Joachim. "Horace – A Cook?" Classical Quarterly 72 (1978) 333–48.
 Cucchiarelli, Andrea. La satira e il poeta : Orazio tra Epodi e Sermones. Pisa: Giardini, 2001. .
 Freudenburg, Kirk. "Horace's Satiric Program and the Language of Contemporary Theory in Satires 2.1." American Journal of Philology 111 (1990) 187–203.
 Freudenburg, Kirk. The Walking Muse: Horace on the Theory of Satire. Princeton, N.J.: Princeton University Press, 1993. .
 Freudenburg, Kirk. The Cambridge Companion to Roman Satire. Cambridge: Cambridge University Press, 2005. .
 Hudson, Nicola A. "Food in Roman Satire," in: Braund, Susan H., ed. Satire and Society in Ancient Rome. Exeter: University of Exeter Press, 1989, 69–87.
 Knorr, Ortwin. Verborgene Kunst : Argumentationsstruktur und Buchaufbau in den Satiren des Horaz. Hildesheim: Olms-Weidmann, 2004. .
 Lowrie, Michèle, “Slander and Horse Law in Horace, Sermones 2.1,” Law and Literature 17 (2005) 405-31. 
 Muecke, Frances. "Law, Rhetoric, and Genre in Horace, Satires 2.1." In: Harrison, Stephen J., ed. Homage to Horace. Oxford: Oxford University Press, 1995, 203–218.
 Rudd, Niall. The Satires of Horace. Berkeley: University of California Press, 1966 (2nd. ed., 1982). .
 Roberts, Michael. "Horace Satires 2.5: Restrained Indignation," American Journal of Philology 105 (1984) 426–33.
 Rothaus Caston, Ruth. "The Fall of the Curtain (Horace S. 2.8)." Transactions of the American Philological Association 127 (1997) 233–56.
 Sallmann, Klaus. "Satirische Technik in Horaz' Erbschleichersatire (s. 2, 5)." Hermes 98 (1970) 178–203.
 Schlegel, Catherine. Satire and the Threat of Speech: Horace's Satires, Book 1. Madison: University of Wisconsin Press, 2005. .

External links

 

Poetry by Horace
1st-century BC Latin books
Satirical poems